Herochroma subtepens is a moth of the family Geometridae first described by Francis Walker in 1860. It is found on Borneo, Sumatra and Peninsular Malaysia. The habitat consists of lowland and lower montane forests.

References

Moths described in 1860
Pseudoterpnini
Moths of Asia